The Yakovlev UT-1 was a single-seater trainer aircraft used by the Soviet Air Force from 1937 until the late 1940s.

Development
The Yakovlev UT-1 was designed as a single-seater advanced trainer and aerobatic airplane by the team led by Alexander Sergeyevich Yakovlev. The first prototype, designated the AIR-14, was flown in early 1936.  The AIR-14 was a small low-winged monoplane with a fixed tailwheel undercarriage, with a welded steel fuselage and wooden wings.

After some changes, the AIR-14 was accepted for production. Among other improvements, the 75 kW (100 hp) Shvetsov M-11 radial was changed to the more powerful 86 kW (115 hp) M-11G. The plane received the designation UT-1 (uchebno-trenirovochnyi {учебно-тренировочный}, primary/advanced trainer); despite this designation, it was not suitable for primary training.

The UT-1 was used as a transitional type between the UT-2 and fighters like the I-16. It was not easy to fly, requiring precise piloting, thus forming an ideal intermediate between basic trainers and the maneuverable but difficult-to-fly I-16. In 1939 the plane was modified by moving the engine 26 cm (10 in) forward, which improved its handling. During production, the 112 kW (150 hp) M-11E engine was also used. Soviet pilots broke several records with the UT-1 before World War II, some with its floatplane variant. In total, 1,241 aircraft were built between December 1936 and 1940.

During World War II, from 1941, the UT-1 was also used for reconnaissance. Some were used as improvised combat machines, after fitting with underwing machine guns or even two unguided rockets. In February 1942, about 50 UT-1 were converted in workshops as improvised UT-1B (УТ-1б) ground-attack planes, fitted with two machine guns and two-four rockets. They were next used in Black Sea Fleet aviation in Sevastopol and Caucasus. The survivors were disarmed in December 1942.

Variants
There were a large number of variants, the most numerous or noteworthy were:

 AIR-14 - Prototype of UT-1
 AIR-18 - UT-1 with a 104 kW (140 hp) Renault Bengali 4 inline engine  and closed canopy, retractable undercarriage.
 AIR-21 (Ya-21, UT-21) - UT-1 with 164 kW (220 hp) Renault Bengali 6 engine, tested in 1938-39, fixed undercarriage.
 UT-1B - Wartime attack version with two ShKAS machine guns and two or four RS-82 rockets.
 UT-1E - (UT-1(15) For tests at TsAGI (sometimes confused with AIR-15, which was not a variant of UT-1).
 UT-1 Floatplane - with M-11Ye engine which later became standard in the majority of UT-1's.

Operators

Soviet Air Force
Soviet Naval Aviation

Chinese Nationalist Air Force

Specifications (UT-1 with M-11Ye)

See also

Notes

References

 
 

1930s Soviet sport aircraft
1930s Soviet military trainer aircraft
UT-1
Aerobatic aircraft
Single-engined tractor aircraft
Low-wing aircraft
Aircraft first flown in 1936